Ulmeni may refer to several places in Romania:

 Ulmeni, a town in Maramureș County
 Ulmeni, a commune in Buzău County
 Ulmeni, a commune in Călăraşi County
 Ulmeni, a village in Bogdana Commune, Teleorman County